was a shōjo manga magazine formerly published by Kodansha, beginning in 1962. Kodansha used the knowledge gained from publishing magazines aimed at young girls, including Nakayoshi and Shōjo Club, as well as the experience from publishing Weekly Shonen Magazine. Shōjo Friend is considered the successor to Shōjo Club. In 1963, Shueisha began publishing Margaret, and the two magazines became fierce competitors. Shogakukan entered the market competition in 1968 with Shōjo Comic.

During this time, popular series such as Haikara-san ga Tōru (by Waki Yamato) and Seito Shokun! (by Yōko Shōji) were published in Shōjo Friend. Despite the popularity of these series, the circulation began to decline and the magazine dropped from weekly to bi-monthly publication, and then finally to monthly publication.

The final issue was released in September 1996, an event which surprised many people as Shōjo Friend had been ranked third, following Nakayoshi and Ribon. The cessation of publication was reported widely in the TV news as well. The remaining content which was supposed to have been published in Shōjo Friend was absorbed in Dessert and The Dessert as special inserts through 1999.

Manga serializations

Tetsuya Chiba 
Yuki no Taiyou (1962)
Misokkasu (1966)
Akane-chan (1967)

Waki Yamato 
Mon Cherie Coco (1971)
Hitoribocchi Ruca (1974)
Love Pack (1974)
Haikara-san ga Tōru (1975)
Lady Mitsuko (1976)
Kigen 2600 Nen no Playball (1979)
Aiiro Shinwa (1980)
Yokohama Monogatari (1980)
Tsubasa Aru Mono (1980)
N.Y. Komachi (1986)
Bodaiju (1984)

Osamu Tezuka 
Princess Knight (1967 version)

Fujio Akatsuka 
Jajako-Chan (1965 - 1967)

Kazuo Umezu 
Hebi Shoujo (1965)
Hangyojin (1965)
Kagehime (1966)
Akumu (1966)
Kuroi Nekomen (1966)

Moto Hagio 
Bianca (1969)

Yōko Shōji 
Seito Shokun!

Ritsuko Abe 
Dekkai Chanto Atsumare (1971)
Suekko Taifuu (1972)
Mama no Ojisama (1972)
Teki wa Tsuyoi Zo Tegowai Zo! (1974)
Nonnon Plus 3 (1976)

Yu Asagiri 
Onnanoko no Fushigi (1990)
Kurenai Densetsu (1991)
Onnanoko no Honki (1991)

Machiko Satonaka 
Pia no Shouzou (1964)
Nana to Lili (1967)
Ashita Kagayaku (1972)
Aries no Otome-tachi (1973)
Umi no Aurora (1977)
Pia no Shouzou (1984)

Miyuki Yorita 
Kokuhaku wo Request (1995)
Kabocha no Caramel

Hiromi Washiba 
Kimi ga Waratta

Chikako Kikukawa 
Mienai Sakebi (1986)

Youko Shouji 
Darling Kishidan (1985)

See also
List of manga magazines

References

http://www.koredeiinoda.net/category/manga/jajakochan

External links

1962 establishments in Japan
1996 disestablishments in Japan
Defunct magazines published in Japan
Magazines established in 1962
Magazines disestablished in 1996
Magazines published in Tokyo
Monthly manga magazines published in Japan
Semimonthly manga magazines published in Japan
Shōjo manga magazines
Weekly manga magazines published in Japan